The floods in Pakistan began in late July 2010, resulting from heavy monsoon rains in the Khyber Pakhtunkhwa, Sindh, Punjab and, Balochistan regions of Pakistan, which affected the Indus River basin. Approximately one-fifth of Pakistan's total land area was affected by floods, with the Khyber Pakhtunkhwa province facing the brunt of the damage and casualties (above 90% of all the deaths occurred in the province). Nationwide, there were 1,985 deaths. According to Pakistani government data, the floods directly affected about 20 million people, mostly by destruction of property, livelihood and infrastructure.

UN Secretary-General Ban Ki-moon had initially asked for US$460 million (€420 million) for emergency relief, noting that the flood was the worst disaster he had ever seen. Only 20% of the relief funds requested had been received on 15 August 2010. The U.N. had been concerned that aid was not arriving fast enough, and the World Health Organization reported that ten million people were forced to drink unsafe water. The Pakistani economy was harmed by extensive damage to infrastructure and crops. Damage to structures was estimated to exceed US$4 billion (€2.5 billion), and wheat crop damages were estimated to be over US$500 million (€425 million). Total economic impact may have been as much as US$43 billion (€35 billion).

Causes
The floods were driven by rain. The rainfall anomaly map published by NASA showed unusually intense monsoon rains attributed to La Niña. On 21 June, the Pakistan Meteorological Department cautioned that urban and flash flooding could occur from July to September in the north parts of the country. The same department recorded above-average rainfall in the months of July and August 2010 and monitored the flood wave progression. Discharge levels were comparable to those of the floods of 1988, 1995, and 1997. The monsoon rainfall of 2010 over the whole country was the highest since 1994 and the second highest during last 50 years.

A research by Utah State University analyzed conditional instability, moisture flux, and circulation features and the results support a persistent increase in conditional instability during the July premonsoon phase, accompanied by increased frequency of heavy rainfall events. The increased convective activity during the premonsoon phase agrees with the projected increase in the intensity of heavy rainfall events over northern Pakistan. Large-scale circulation analysis reveals an upper-level cyclonic anomaly over and to the west of Pakistan–a feature empirically associated with weak monsoon. The analysis also suggests that the anomalous circulation in 2010 is not sporadic but rather is part of a long-term trend that defies the typical linkage of strong monsoons with an anomalous anticyclone in the upper troposphere.
An article in the New Scientist attributed the cause of the exceptional rainfall to "freezing" of the jet stream, a phenomenon that reportedly also caused unprecedented heat waves and wildfires in Russia as well as the 2007 United Kingdom floods.

In response to previous Indus River floods in 1973 and 1976, Pakistan created the Federal Flood Commission (FFC) in 1977. The FFC operates under Pakistan's Ministry of Water and Power. It is charged with executing flood control projects and protecting lives and property of Pakistanis from the impact of floods. Since its inception the FFC has received Rs 87.8 billion (about US$900 million). FFC documents show that numerous projects were initiated, funded and completed, but reports indicate that little work has actually been done due to ineffective leadership and corruption.

Flooding and impact

Floods

Monsoon rains were forecast to continue into early August and were described as the worst in this area in the last 80 years. On 28 July, the same heavy rains contributed to the crash of Airblue Flight 202 in the Margalla Hills. On 30 July 500,000 or more people had been displaced from their homes. On 30 July, Manuel Bessler, head of the UN Office for the Coordination of Humanitarian Affairs, stated that 36 districts were involved, and 950,000 people were affected, although within a day, reports increased that number to as high as a million, and by mid-August they increased the number to nearly 20 million affected.

By mid-August, according to the governmental Federal Flood Commission (FFC), the floods had caused the deaths of at least 1,540 people, while 2,088 people had received injuries, 557,226 houses had been destroyed, and over 6 million people had been displaced. One month later, the tally had risen to 1,781 deaths, 2,966 people with injuries, and more than 1.89 million homes destroyed.

The Khyber Pakhtunkhwa provincial minister of information, Mian Iftikhar Hussain, said "the infrastructure of this province was already destroyed by terrorism. Whatever was left was finished off by these floods." He also called the floods "the worst calamity in our history." Four million Pakistanis were left with food shortages.

The Karakoram Highway, which connects Pakistan with China, was closed after a bridge was destroyed. The ongoing devastating floods in Pakistan will have a severe impact on an already vulnerable population, according to the International Committee of the Red Cross (ICRC). In addition to all the other damage the floods caused, floodwater destroyed much of the health care infrastructure in the worst-affected areas, leaving inhabitants especially vulnerable to water-borne disease. In Sindh, the Indus River burst its banks near Sukkur on 8 August, submerging the village of Mor Khan Jatoi. Law and order disappeared, mainly in Sindh. Looters took advantage of the floods by ransacking abandoned homes using boats.

In early August, the heaviest flooding moved southward along the Indus River from severely affected northern regions toward western Punjab, where at least  of cropland were destroyed, and toward the southern province of Sindh. The affected crops included cotton, sugarcane, rice, pulses, tobacco and animal fodder. According to the Pakistan Cotton Ginners Association, the floods destroyed 2 million bales of cotton, which increased futures prices. 170,000 citizens (or 70% of the population) of the historic Sindh town of Thatta fled advancing flood waters on 27 August.

By mid-September the floods generally had begun to recede, although in some areas, such as Sindh, new floods were reported; the majority of the displaced persons had not been able to return home.

Heavy rainfalls recorded during the wet spell of July 2010

* Indicates new record.

The power infrastructure of Pakistan also took a severe blow from the floods, which damaged about 10,000 transmission lines and transformers, feeders and power houses in different flood-hit areas. Flood water inundated Jinnah Hydro power. The damage caused a power shortfall of 3.135 gigawatts.

Infectious diseases (e.g. gastroenteritis, diarrhoea, and skin diseases) due to lack of clean drinking water and sanitation pose a serious new risk to flood victims. On 14 August, the first documented case of cholera emerged in the town of Mingora, striking fear into millions of stranded flood victims, who were already suffering from gastroenteritis and diarrhoea. Pakistan also faced a malaria outbreak.

The International Red Cross reported that unexploded ordnance, such as mines and artillery shells, had been flushed downstream by the floods from areas in Kashmir and Waziristan and scattered in low-lying areas, posing a future risk to returning inhabitants.

The United Nations estimated that 800,000 people were cut off by floods in Pakistan and were only reachable by air. It also stated that at least 40 more helicopters are needed to ferry lifesaving aid to increasingly desperate people. Many of those cut off are in the mountainous northwest, where roads and bridges have been swept away.

By order of President Asif Ali Zardari, there were no official celebrations of Pakistan's 63rd Independence Day on 14 August, due to the calamity.

Potential long-term effects

Flood
Floods submerged  of Pakistan's most fertile crop land, killed 200,000 livestock and washed away massive amounts of grain. A major concern was that farmers would be unable to meet the fall deadline for planting new seeds in 2010, which implied a loss of food production in 2011, and potential long term food shortages.

Agricultural crops such as cotton, rice, and sugarcane and to some extent mangoes were badly affected in Punjab, according to a Harvest Tradings-Pakistan spokesman. He called for the international community to fully participate in the rehabilitation process, as well as for the revival of agricultural crops in order to get better GDP growth in the future.

In affected Multan Division in South Punjab, some people were seen to be engaging in price-gouging in this disaster, raising prices up to Rs 130/kg. Some called for Zarai Taraqiati Bank Limited to write off all agricultural loans in the affected areas in Punjab, Sindh and Khyber Pukhtunkhwa especially for small farmers.

On 24 September, the World Food Programme announced that about 70% of Pakistan's population, mostly in rural areas, did not have adequate access to proper nutrition.

Already resurgent in the Federally Administered Tribal Areas and Khyber-Pakhtunkhwa province, agricultural devastation brought on by the floods left Pakistan more susceptible to an increase in poppy cultivation, given the crop's resiliency and relatively few inputs.

Infrastructure
Public building damage is estimated at $1 billion. Aid donors estimate that 5,000 schools were destroyed.

Climate-resilient model villages
Following the 2010 floods, the Punjab government subsequently constructed 22 'disaster-resilient' model villages, comprising 1885 single-storey homes, together with schools and health centres. The Climate & Development Knowledge Network was engaged to advise on how to make the new infrastructure resilient to extreme weather events occurring in the future. The idea was that the villages should provide 'triple wins' of limiting greenhouse gas emissions, promoting development and building resilience to climatic events. Now inhabited, the model villages incorporate biogas plants, solar energy systems, livestock sheds, covered sewerage, brick-paved streets, parks, play areas, markets and community centres.

Taliban insurgency
It was reported that the flood would divert Pakistani military forces from fighting the Pakistani Taliban insurgents (TTP) in the northwest to help in the relief effort, giving Taliban fighters a reprieve to regroup. Helping flood victims gave the US an opportunity to improve its image.

Pakistani Taliban also engaged in relief efforts, making inroads where the government was absent or seen as corrupt. As the flood dislodged many property markers, it was feared that governmental delay and corruption would give the Taliban the opportunity to settle these disputes swiftly. In August a Taliban spokesperson asked the Pakistani government to reject Western help from "Christians and Jews" and claimed that the Taliban could raise $20 million to replace that aid.

According to a US official, the TTP issued a threat saying that it would launch attacks against foreigners participating in flood relief operations. In response, the United Nations said it was reviewing security arrangements for its workers. The World Health Organization stated that work in the Khyber Pakhtunkhwa province was already suffering because of security concerns.

A self-proclaimed Taliban spokesperson based in Orakzai told The Express Tribune: "We have not issued any such threat; and we don't have any plans to attack relief workers." Nevertheless, three American Christians were reported killed by the Taliban on 25 August in the Swat Valley.

Political effects
The floods' aftermath was thought likely contribute to public perception of inefficiency and to political unrest. These political effects of the floods were compared with that of the 1970 Bhola cyclone. The scepticism within the country extended to outside donors. Less than 20% of the pledged aid was scheduled to go through the government, according to Prime Minister Yousuf Raza Gilani, with the remainder flowing through non-governmental organisations. The government's response was complicated by insurgencies (in Balochistan and Waziristan), growing urban sectarian discord, increasing suicide bombings against core institutions and relations with India.

Economic effects
On 7 September 2010, the International Labour Organization reported that the floods had cost more than 5.3 million jobs, stating that "productive and labour intensive job creation programmes are urgently needed to lift millions of people out of poverty that has been aggravated by flood damage". Forecasts estimated that the GDP growth rate of 4% prior to the floods would turn to −2% to −5% followed by several additional years of below-trend growth. As a result, Pakistan was unlikely to meet the International Monetary Fund's target budget deficit cap of 5.1% of GDP, and the existing $55 billion of external debt was set to grow. Crop losses were expected to impact textile manufacturing, Pakistan's largest export sector. The loss of over 10 million head of livestock along with the loss of other crops would reduce agricultural production by more than 15%. Toyota and Unilever Pakistan said that the floods would sap growth, necessitating production cuts as people coped with the destruction. Parvez Ghias, the chief executive of Pakistan's largest automotor manufacturer Toyota, described the economy's state as "fragile". Nationwide car sales were predicted to fall as much as 25%, forcing automakers to reduce production in October–2010 from the prior level of 200 cars per day. Milk supplies fell by 15%, which caused the retail price of milk to increase by Pk Rs 4 (5 US cents) per litre.

Relief efforts

By the end of July 2010, Pakistan had appealed to international donors for help in responding to the disaster, having provided twenty-one helicopters and 150 boats to assist affected people, according to its National Disaster Management Authority. At that time the US embassy in Pakistan had provided seven helicopters. The United Nations launched its relief efforts and appealed for US$460 million (€420 million) to provide immediate help, including food, shelter and clean water. On 14 August, UN Secretary-General Ban Ki-moon visited Pakistan to oversee and discuss the relief efforts. A Pakistani army spokesman said that troops had been deployed in all affected areas and had rescued thousands of people. Prime Minister Yousaf Raza Gillani visited the province and directed the Pakistan Navy to help evacuate the flood victims. By early August, more than 352,291 people have been rescued.

By the end of August, the Relief Web Financial Tracking service indicated that worldwide donations for humanitarian assistance had come to $687 million, with a further $324 million promised in uncommitted pledges.

Since the early stages of the emergency, the United Nations had warned of a potential "second wave of death" that would result from post-flood disease and food shortages, stating that 3.5 million children were at risk of death if they did not get assistance, including due to cholera. UN spokesperson Maurizio Giuliano stated that "an already colossal disaster [was] getting worse and requiring an even more colossal response", referring to the relief operations as "a marathon at sprint pace" and acknowledging shortcomings in the response insofar as the needs were outpacing available resources also due to endless rains. He indicated that the floods had a worse impact than several other recent natural disasters combined, and that they were the worst natural disaster in United Nations history.

According to UNOCHA, by 2011, a total of $2,653,281,105 had been raised in humanitarian support, the largest amount by the US (25.8%), followed by private individuals and organisations (13.4%) and Japan (11.3%).

With need for substantial support to repair infrastructure, US Secretary of State Hillary Clinton suggested that the Pakistani government enlarge its tax base by asking the wealthy citizens of Pakistan to contribute more for their country; by that time both the US and the EU each had contributed about US$450 million, €395 million for the relief effort.

Response by national governments
 Afghanistan finance minister Omar Zakhilwal handed a cheque worth US$1 million (45 million Afghanis) to Pakistani ambassador Mohammad Sadiq at the end of a press conference in Afghan capital Kabul.
 Algeria donated €100,000 to Pakistan.
 Argentina sent drinkable water.
 Australia announced to contribute and said that it will double its aid program to Pakistan to $66.5 million in official development assistance in 2010–2011, as well as committing two C17 Globemaster aircraft to deliver emergency supplies and to assist relief efforts and deploying a medical task force consisting of up to 180 personnel and more than 33 tonnes of equipment.
 Austria donated €5.6 million to Pakistan.
 Azerbaijan gave US$2 million financial assistance to help the victims and eliminate the aftermath of the disaster. The Azerbaijani embassy in Pakistan said the Azerbaijani president, Ilham Aliyev ordered to send two Il-76 planes with a humanitarian assistance on board to Pakistan. One of the planes delivered 40 tonnes of humanitarian cargo to Pakistan. Also the staff of Azerbaijan embassy in Pakistan also transferred its two-days' salary worth around $2,000 to relief fund.
 Bahrain donated $6.9 million to Pakistan.
 Belarus donated blankets, tents, canned meat, water, and medicines, all worth around €200,000.
 Belgium donated €150,000 for the victims.
 Botswana donated US$103,040.
 Brazil donated US$0.7 million through World Food Programme or life-saving assistance to the affected.
 Canada announced that it would donate C$2 million worth of emergency aid. C$750,000 are expected to be donated to the ICRC for distribution of shelter-materials and water, sanitation and health-services, while the remainder goes to the WFP to provide much-needed food-assistance. On 14 August the Canadian government announced an additional C$32 million in aid. The Canadian government announced on 22 August that it will match, dollar-for-dollar, citizen donations made to registered charities between 2 August and 12 September, later extended to 3 October 2010. On 14 September, an additional $C7.5 million in relief aid was announced by the Canadian government.
 In September 2010, China had provided 320 million yuan (US$47.1 million) worth of humanitarian supplies to Pakistan in four batches with $200 million more aid promised by Premier Wen Jiabao. which will total 1.86 billion yuan (US$274 million). China initially announced that it would provide emergency aid worth 10 million yuan (approx. US$1.48 million) to help the flood-victims. The People's Liberation Army donated another 10 million yuan to Pakistan. The Chinese Red Cross also gave US$50,000 in cash to Pakistan. The Chinese ambassador to Pakistan travelled to Khyber Pakhtunkhwa and expressed his condolences to those affected by the tragedy. On 13 August, China announced further emergency humanitarian aid worth 50 million yuan (US$7.35 million) bringing the total official Chinese relief aid then to more than 70 million yuan (approx. US$10.3 million). A Chinese search and rescue team arrived in the southern Pakistani city of Thatta, Sindh Province, where heavy floods swept away hundreds of villages. The Chinese rescue team, consisting of more than 60 members, set up tents and field hospitals to provide medical services to flood victims. The Red Cross Society of China and some of China's local governments had also offered cash and material assistance to Pakistan. China announced another aid package of 200 million RMB on 6 September. Chinese ambassador in Pakistan Lui Jian said that the Chinese total contribution had reached 50 million dollars with another batch of $200 million promised by China's premier Wen Jiabao on 23 September. On 20 September, China dispatched 4 of its military helicopters to aid in the search and rescue to Pakistan, which is the first time China had ever dispatched military helicopters overseas to perform such duties. The helicopters also provided flood relief aid.
 Cyprus donated €131,062 to Pakistan.
 The Czech military have sent 24 flights with humanitarian aid.
 Denmark donated 63 million DKK (11 million euro) in relief efforts and another 130 million DKK (22 million euro) in further development aid.
 Egypt donated medicine, medical supplies and foodstuffs.
 Estonia donated 64,000 €.
 The European Union released €10 million to help Pakistan's flood victims on 11 August, as part of emergency aid to flood-stricken country. By 18 August, the EU had committed to spending €70 million (90 million dollars) on aid for victims of the floods.
 Finland government donated €1.2 million for humanitarian assistance to the flood victims. €600,000 were channelled through the World Health Organization, €400,000 through the UNHCR and €200,000 through Finn Church Aid.
 France donated 1.05 million € and 35 tonnes of emergency supplies, tarpaulins, tanks, blankets, jerry cans, kitchen sets, water purification tablets, 200 shelters and anti-cholera medicines.
 Georgia donated €100,000 in aid to Pakistan.
 Germany initially committed €1 million for the victims, which was further increased to €2 million on 6 August. On 12 August, Germany announced a €13 million aid package. On 13 August Germany increased its aid commitment by €10 million to now €25 million in direct help plus €43 million via contributions through international organisations with which it is associated. In addition there have been private donations to charities in the scale of €24 million up to 18 August. The Muslim community in Germany also donated generously for the victims of Pakistan floods.
 Greece donated €100,000.
 Hong Kong donated HK$ 3 million to World Vision for a relief project for flood victims in Pakistan.
 Hungary donated €50,000.
 Iceland contributed ISK 23 million (€190,000) to emergency aid in areas impacted by the monsoon floods in Pakistan.
 Indonesia The Government of Indonesia dispatched a cargo flight carrying humanitarian assistance of US$1million for the flood victims. The relief assistance which arrived at the Chaklala Air base by a charted cargo flight consisted of 15 tons of emergency supplies included 4.5 tons of ready to eat meals' packets, 3 tons of medicines, 5 tons of powdered milk for children, 4000 blankets and 4000 Sarongs. On behalf of the Government of the Republic of Indonesia the donation of the relief goods was handed over by the Ambassador of the Republic of Indonesia H.E. Mr. Ishak Latuconsina to the State Minister for Information and Broadcasting Mr. Sumsam Ali Shah Bukhari at the Chaklala Air base on 7 August 2010.
 India, on 13 August, offered condolences and $5 million in financial aid. Pakistan accepted the offer on 20 August, a day after the meeting between Indian and Pakistani Prime Ministers. On 1 September 2010, India raised the aid amount to US$25 million. Nearly 400 Indian medical staff have been waiting for the Pakistan government's visa approval to help flood victims. India had also already supplied the first consignment of 25 truck-loads of potato to Pakistan.
 Iran had committed over 400 tonnes of relief goods; out of which 330 tonnes had already been delivered by the Iranian transport aircraft as of 24 August 2010. Iran also offered to set up field hospitals and community centres for flood victims in Pakistan. In response to the UN's appeal for help at New York, Iran committed US$10 million towards the flood relief. In addition to this fund, Imam Khomeini Relief Committee was directed to collect private donations from Iranians and donate it to Pakistani government. Iran also assured Pakistan of its continued support and aid into the future. In order to better supply relief to flood victims, Iranian president Dr. Ahmadinejad would visit the flood hit areas of Pakistan. Iran started to send an additional 1,100 tonnes of relief goods to Pakistan on 5 September 2010 as part of its ongoing relief operation. On 12 September 2010, Iran allocated an additional US$100 million for Pakistan flood relief. 51% of all relief distributed by International red crescent in Pakistan had been donated by Iran. Iran announced on 8 November 2010 that in addition to 5,300 tonnes of aid cargo shipped by Iran to Pakistan, the Iranian hajj pilgrims will donate money and the 103,000 slaughtered sheep of Iranian pilgrims to Pakistan.
 An initial €200,000 was donated by the government of the Republic of Ireland. An additional €550,000 was added on 9 August 2010. Then the total was €960,000. The Irish media were critical of the country's government for providing less than half the aid it donated to Haiti after the earthquake there. €1.19 million was added on 19 August, bringing the total at that stage to €2 million, the total given to the Haiti disaster. Minister for Overseas Development Peter Power, TD, said at the time that more aid would be forthcoming from Ireland and that the country had provided a "proportionally greater" amount than "most other European countries". The Irish public had provided an additional sum of more than €2.5 million by 20 August. Ireland proved to be the most generous European country in donating aid to Pakistan.
 Israel offered aid to Pakistan, but the officials said they have not received an answer from Pakistan on whether or not the aid should be forwarded.
 Italy provided €1.33 million, including a humanitarian aid flight carrying emergency supplies such as medicines, generators, water purifiers and containers.
 Japan provided US$230,000 for emergency relief goods, while additional assistance of up to $3 million was committed for the disaster aftermath. In a press release, Japan announced to extend the aid to $14.4 million (approx. 1.22 billion JPY) in total, in the form of the provision of emergency relief goods, as well as food, water, sanitation etc. Japan is also expected to send a unit of six helicopters and some 300 SDF Troops
 Jordan A plane carrying food and medical supplies left for Pakistan on 15 August. It carried 25-member medical team, including nine doctors, as well as 21,000 typhoid and cholera vaccines.
 Kosovo donated €150,000 to the Government of Pakistan's flood relief efforts.
 Kuwait donated US$5 million to victims of the severe floods in Pakistan, according to Kuwait Red Crescent Society (KRCS). The Kuwaiti government lifted a ban on collecting donations, this exception was made on the order to collect aid for floods in Pakistan, donation camps were set up in mosques and shopping malls across the country. The fundraising campaign named 'Kuwait is with you' which began grandly at the Grand Mosque of Kuwait, where close to 1,000 worshippers donated generously for Pakistan.
 Lebanon sent a plane to Pakistan with humanitarian aid.
 Lithuania donated LTL 50,000.
 Luxembourg donated €2,364,621 to the victims.
 Malaysia donated $1 million to help people in flood-hit Pakistan.
 The Maldives collected MVR 10 million (US$1 million) for Pakistan. The people are collecting more money. All the Maldivian broadcasting channels held a 24-hour telethon to help Pakistan and got MVR 1 million.
 Malta donated €13,106.
 Mauritius donated US$300,000.
 Monaco donated €127,065.
 Morocco sent a plane carrying 12 tonnes of humanitarian aid.
 Nepal cabinet provided cash assistance of Rs 10 million for flood victims in Pakistan.
 Netherlands donated €3.6 million. Netherlands The population of the Netherlands collected more than 17 million euros for relief aid in Pakistan. The Netherlands provided an additional 5,000,000 Euros for victims of the catastrophic flooding in Pakistan on 5 November 2010.
 New Zealand donated NZ$4 million towards relief efforts in Pakistan.
 Nigeria also assisted Pakistan by donating US$1 million.
 Norway facilitated relief operation by providing NOK 30 million. NOK 9 million were given to UN Central Emergency Response Fund, and NOK 21 million were allocated to UNICEF, Pakistan Emergency Response Fund (ERF), and Pakistan Red Crescent Society
 Oman donated US$500,000 for the victims. The Oman Charitable Organisation (OCO) send 2,336MT of aid to Pakistan, comprising foodstuffs, water, Dates, tents, relief supplies and tools.
 Palestine donated 3000 tons of humanitarian supplies to Pakistan.
 Poland donated €196,592.
 Qatar Red Crescent appealed for QR 6.5 million and as part of its Ramadan campaign allocated QR1.5 million to its humanitarian mission. QATAR Charity (QC) started delivering food packs worth QR7 million ($2 million) in collaboration with the World Food Programme (WFP). It also plans to airlift 80 tonnes of emergency relief items, totalling around QR 2.2 million ($600,000).
 Russia have sent two Russian Il-76 cargo planes with emergency relief.
 Samoa donated US$20,000.
 Saudi Arabia allocated more than US$361.99 million for the relief operation, topping the list of all donating countries: US$105.29 million donated by the Saudi Government, US$14.7 million donated by the Saudi Fund for Development, and US$242 million collected through Saudi Public Fund Relief. Saudi Arabia released a statement announcing the establishment of an air-bridge to ferry relief-supplies to Pakistan, 30 major air relief shipments were sent to land in Punjab, Sindh, Khyber-Pakhtunkhwa and Balochistan, in what is the largest air bridge in support of flood victims in Pakistan. The Saudi ambassador Abdul Aziz bin Ibrahim al-Ghadeer completely dedicated himself to relief efforts and hardly visited his office in Islamabad because of his constant field presence in Lahore, Multan and Hyderabad. As of 30 August, relief goods worth US$40 million had been delivered and some $67 million worth of relief goods were in the pipeline; US$5.3 million had been handed over to National Disaster Management Authority – NDMA Pakistan in cash. Two 100-bed mobile hospitals were also donated by the Saudi Government to the flood victims. Saudi public response was also staggering, as women donated jewellery to fundraising camps. In the aftermath of floods, Prince Al-Waleed bin Talal and Princess Amerah Al Taweel, visited the flood affected areas of Pakistan and took 10 tons of relief materials with them.
 Singapore donated 50 thousand US dollars, 800 water filters and 10,000 blankets.
 Slovakia donated €170,380. Slovakia also donated power generators, water pumps and tents.
 Slovenia donated €13,106 to Pakistan.
 Sri Lanka dispatched 18 metric tons of relief goods worth approx US$3 million to Pakistan on a Sri Lankan Air Force C-130. The Health Ministry will also send will be in the 15 member special medical team to Pakistan.
 Spain have sent out two aircraft containing 15 tonnes of aid material for the victims.
 Sweden will send eight water cleaning aggregates which together have a capacity to support 18,000 people with clean drinking water.
 Switzerland donated CHF 3 million to Pakistan.
 Sudan donated 10 tonnes of food, medicine and shelter equipment as well as a medical team including all disciplines.
 Syria announced that it would send 35 tonnes of foodstuffs, medical supplies, medicines and many other necessary materials to help flood victims.
 Thailand donated US$75,000.
 Tunisia sent a plane with 13 tons of food products, medicine, blankets and clothes.
 Turkey launched the biggest aid campaign in modern Turkish history, Turkey donated €5 million to Pakistan initially, in addition to 115 tonnes of humanitarian aid consisting of food packages, blankets, sleeping bags and beds delivered to Pakistan Red Crescent Society. By 18 August, Turkey donated more than €13 million and issued a rallying cry and launched a large-scale relief effort for flood-ravaged Pakistan. Turkey also sent ever-largest humanitarian aid ship Defne with 4,800 tons of aid materials. Turkey also sent a train carrying humanitarian aid for the flood-stricken Pakistan; the train is loaded with humanitarian aid collected by Turkey's Sabah (daily newspaper)-ATV (TV channel) Group and Turkish Red Crescent. The aid consists of 300 prefabricated houses, 2,000 food parcels, 930 sacks of flour, hygienic materials, dried food, diapers and potable water. Apart from the state and its organisations, a number of Turkish businessmen also initiated aid campaigns for Pakistan, the Turkish business community in Belgium also donated an amount of €30,000. The Turkish government also announced building of a Turkish town in the flood-stricken Pakistan. Turkey donated a total of $11 million to Pakistan. Turkish Prime Minister Erdogan also visited parts of flood-stricken Pakistan, Erdoğan to witness aid efforts, including the completion of a village of 2,000 prefabricated houses built by the Turkish Red Crescent near Multan After the flood when the Turkish Prime Minister could not come to Pakistan due to his engagements he sent his wife Emine Erdoğan to help the flood victims. She came to Pakistan and personally gave the keys of the houses constructed by Turkish welfare organisation to the flood affectees. She also donated her personal jewellery including her precious necklace, for the flood relief efforts. Prime Minister Yousaf Raza Gilani conferred on Begum Emine Erdogan, Hilal-i-Pakistan the highest civilian medal of Pakistan for her efforts for the flood victims.
 Turkmenistan sent about 40 tons of cargo, including food and medicines.
 United Arab Emirates ordered for sending humanitarian assistance on emergency basis and sent a team of 42 troops of the UAE Armed Forces Relief Team along with fleet of Chinook helicopters which evacuated more than three thousand people. The UAE Force in Afghanistan distributed 30MT of relief materials and food to flooded areas of the country. The UAE Force worked jointly with the Armed Force of Pakistan in the areas of Punjab, Sindh and Balochistan. The UAE also pledged to donate $5 million for the flood relief operations in Pakistan. A telethon campaign named, "Awnakum" (Your Help), by the Red Crescent Authority (RCA) raised 72 million AED ($21 million) through shopping centres, mobile phone messages, radio and television stations. Her Highness Fatima bint Mubarak Al Ketbi, the wife of the founder and the first president of UAE, personally donated AED 5 million towards the aid of floods victims in Pakistan. The Red Crescent also dispatched 70 tons of essential relief supplies. UAE through Red Crescent also dispatched two 2 ships carrying basic necessities for the flood victims worth US$10 million. Mobile military medical field hospitals were also set up by the UAE in parts of Punjab, Sindh and Balochistan to provide medical aid. The UAE Ambassador to Pakistan Ali Saif Al-Awani also devoted himself and supervised, coordinated and facilitated the relief operations and also visited mobile medical hospital and attended massive vaccination campaigns in the affected parts of the country. UAE will also build an 'Emirates village' in the Khyber Pakhtunkhwa at the cost of US$8 million with 20,000 tents accommodating 140,000 people. Sheikh Khalifa Bin Zayed Al Nahyan also announced the vaccination of 750,000 children in Sindh. Recently, UAE launched a $100 million project for assisting Pakistan's flood affected people, the project will include creating job opportunities in the flood-hit areas, with focus on- education, public health, roads and bridges.
 The United Kingdom committed £134 million to the relief and recovery effort, in addition to bringing forward a £10 million bridge project to replace some of those washed away. Private donations coordinated via the Disasters Emergency Committee totalled more than £60 million Interventions carried out or under way include the flying in of 400 metric tons of aid, and providing tents, shelter kits, blankets, water containers and nutritional interventions. Former British Prime Minister Gordon Brown also acknowledged the slow international response and urged British public to donate generously. Additionally Nick Clegg, the Deputy Prime Minister, described the international response as "absolutely pitiful" on 16 August. One person to respond was His Royal Highness The Prince of Wales, who established a major recovery fund to help support projects on health, education, livelihoods and reconstruction. The Pakistan Recovery Fund will raise a minimum of £2million towards this cause.
 The United States stated that it would provide 56,000 ready meals on 1 August and 2, twelve temporary bridges and two water-filtration-plants to help the flood-victims as part of a US$10 million aid-pledge. Commenting on the floods, the United States Secretary of State, Hillary Clinton, stated, "The Pakistani people are friends and partners, and the United States is standing with them as the tragic human toll mounts from flooding in northwest Pakistan." Hillary Clinton personally donated $10 for flood-relief in an effort to encourage people to donate, no matter how small the amount. On 10 August, US announced another $20 million to provide relief for the affected, taking the flood related aid from United States to US$55 million. On 11 August, US increased its assistance for flood-ravaged Pakistan to $71 million. Additionally, the United States initially provided six US Army CH-47 Chinook helicopters from their duty in Afghanistan. On 12 August, it provided two more CH-53E Super Stallion helicopters to assist the Pakistan Army in their relief efforts. The two helicopters were the first of 19 helicopters that US Defense Secretary Robert Gates ordered for Pakistan. On 13 August, US increased its aid to US$84 million. In addition to this, the United States is providing $3 million to the World Health Organization to expand the capacity of Pakistan's Disease Early Warning System (DEWS) and to establish the first 15 treatment centres for water-borne illness. It is also working with the humanitarian community to spread awareness through radio stations regarding safety precautions against water-borne diseases. On 14 August, further two CH-53E Super Stallion and a MH-53E Sea Dragon arrived in Pakistan to work with Pakistan military in flood-affected areas. On 20 August, the United States pledged an additional $60 million to the U.N. flood relief effort in Pakistan, bringing its total contribution to $150 million.
 Uzbekistan sent 300,000 euros worth of humanitarian aid to Pakistan.
 Vietnam donated 50,000 dollars.
 Yemen donated relief materials including medicine and edible oil.
World Bank provided US$1.3 million (€1 million) to Pakistani government for relief work. The bank additionally approved a loan of US$900 million (€750 million) for medium and long term reconstruction.
United Nations Educational, Scientific and Cultural Organization launched a major project titled "Strategic Strengthening of Flood Warning and Management Capacity of Pakistan" (project period: 2011–2014, project cost: US$3.6 million), under the leadership of Prof. Shahbaz Khan (hydrologist), in cooperation with the Government of Japan. Primary objective of the proposed project was to reduce human and socioeconomic impacts of flooding in Pakistan, to improve the social, economic, and ecological benefits of floods, and to foster safer human settlements near flood plains. Accomplishing this objective required enabling the country's capacity to deal with floods and watershed management in a holistic manner by developing around three inter-related pillars i.e. strategic augmenting of flood forecasting and hazard maps, data sharing platforms, and capacity development. These pillars were further divided into five components which incorporated short-term and medium-term interventions to provide the much needed support for immediate strengthening of early warning systems, while building on lessons learned from the 2010 floods to address the long-term forecasting, disaster management and data sharing issues. Project is now successfully complete.
International Monetary Fund (IMF) also offered to discuss how to help Pakistan manage the economic impact of the floods.
Asian Development Bank offered a loan of 2 billion US dollars for the reconstruction efforts.
Islamic Development Bank offered a loan of 11 million US dollars for the reconstruction efforts.

Response by non-governmental organisations
The Islamic Turkish NGO IHH sent 450 tons of supplies on a train and another on a cargo aeroplane, as well as 3000 tons of medications, medical materials, textile products, tents, blankets, cleaning materials and kitchenware. IHH opened 10 water purification units to supply clean drinking water. The foundation also set up two tent camps. A camp of 70 tents was set up in Nowshera, a city northwest of Islamabad, to house 500 people displaced by flooding. The camps include tents for schooling and for medical doctors. After the urgent relief works, IHH started to build permanent social projects for the upcoming winter season. In the first phase, 100 permanent houses for the flood victims are to be built.

DEC and member charities
The UK based Disasters Emergency Committee, reported that as of 5 October its flood relief appeal had raised over £60 million. As of 14 September, DEC member agencies and their partners had helped nearly three million people. For the first time in the DEC's 45-year history, they saw donations rise rather than fall in the second week of an appeal, and they then saw them rise again in the 3rd week.
Oxfam is currently providing clean water and hot meals to over 180,000 people. In total, Oxfam aims to reach around 900,000 people with clean water, sanitation kits and hygiene supplies.
Save the Children is using helicopters, donkeys and boats to deliver doctors and medical supplies to families cut off by the water. It has sent a medical team and medicines on donkeys in Allai, treated more than one thousand patients, and plans to distribute 800 shelter kits, including tarpaulins, jerry cans and plastic glasses, to flood-affected families.
 The Red Cross has dispatched food and shelter items for distribution by Pakistan Red Crescent volunteers to tens of thousands of people. Additionally, it has provided medicines and medical supplies to hospitals and health centres enabling Pakistan Red Crescent health-care units to treat thousands of people.,
CARE International has provided water purification tablets, tents, family hygiene kits, kitchen sets, tarpaulins and mosquito nets to thousands of survivors. Mobile and basic healthcare units have provided health services to around 4,500 people.
Islamic Relief is distributing 3,570 family hygiene kits in Nowshera and Mardan districts benefitting 24,990 people. Also it is distributing 2,850 household kits (containing mattresses, mosquito nets etc.) and 2,850 kitchen sets to benefit 19,950 people. Pakistani cricket star Shahid Afridi is working with the NGO in raising the aid for the disaster.
Concern has helped 18,000 people and 6,500 people in Charsadda district have received emergency packages. Concern had raised more than €1 million in public donations from the Irish public by 13 August 2010.
World Vision is currently providing clean water and food in Khyber Pakhtoonkhwa province and is treating people at five health clinics. The agency plans to reach 150,000 people during the first 90 days with relief items including water purification packets, hygiene kits, tents, cooking items and food. It also aims to provide cash-for-work activities to 1,000 people, open additional health posts, set up 20 child-friendly spaces and 20 women-friendly spaces to provide a safe and comfortable environment for children and women to interact with peers and receive support. World Vision plans to expand these efforts as floodwaters recede and more communities become accessible.

Other charities
Al-khidmat foundation, A large number of Al-Khidmat volunteers, vehicles and ambulances took part in rescue operations in different areas, saving numerous lives and helping to evacuate stranded populations from flooded places. Over 22,000 volunteers took part in the relief efforts, establishing approximately 1000 relief camps and around 700 medical camps in the affected areas.
ERT Search and Rescue, a UK-based search and rescue charity deployed 10 specialist members of their International Disaster Response Team to Pakistan. The team of volunteer Water Rescue Technicians, Doctors and Paramedics travelled to the Sindh province with Humanitarian Aid such as tents, water, ORS (Oral Rehydration Solutions), food, blankets and medicines etc., all paid for by public and corporate charitable donation. The team also brought ten new 17 ½ foot rescue powerboats from the UK to use in the rescue missions while there.
Focus Humanitarian Assistance (FOCUS), has deployed Disaster Assessment Response Team (DART) members, Community Emergency Response Teams (CERT) as well as Search and Rescue teams to assist in coordination with AKDN helicopters with evacuations, transport relief supplies and medial teams. In collaboration with the Pakistani Army, FOCUS has transported 200 MT of relief goods, 126 MT of food across KPK, Sindh, and Chitral. With the support of the Canadian International Development Agency (CIDA), FOCUS is also supplying tents, tarpaulins, water, hygiene kits and blankets, as well as basic healthcare services, to Khyber-Pakhtunkhwa, Gilgit Balistan, Sindh and Punjab provinces.
Sarhad Rural Support Programme launched its relief and rehabilitation activities in 14 districts of KP with support of UNHCR, local and international donors and philanthropists. Over 165,231 families in 13 districts of KP were provided with NFI's, tents and plastic sheets. 89,000 families were supported with food packages/cooked food and clean portable water. 24,000 beneficiaries were provided with free medical facilities in districts Peshawar, Charsadda, Swat, Dir and Kohistan. Over 400 households were provided with safe drinking water facilities in Chitral. Approximately 10,000 large and small ruminants were vaccinated in Swat. In addition SRSP restored, rehabilitated and refurbished small scale infrastructure benefitting 141,000 men and women. It constructed 6,593 early recovery shelters for the homeless and trained 11,730 men and women in various skills to strengthen livelihood.
Humanity First, in collaboration with NCHD has dispatched over 800 tents as well as mattresses, blankets, floor mats, buckets and shoes. Over 600 water survival boxes have been provided in collaboration with the British Rotary charity WorldWaterWorks Limited. HF has handed out 44 tonnes of food aid, and has assisted over 22,000 people, but the response is expected to rise. Moreover, with 31 medical camps over 5000 patients have been seen.
Heritage Foundation of Pakistan (HF) dispatched immediate relief packages including food and non-food items to more than 500 families in the District of Swat in Khyber Pakhtunkhwa. By 2 September 2010, the Green KaravanGhar Nucleus Houses were being constructed. These are low cost houses that employ materials such as bamboo, lime, mud and stone, which have a low-carbon footprint. More than 150 houses were at hand within a month, in various stages of construction, with almost 70 houses complete. Each unit costs US$550, and it is hoped that 350 units will be constructed in the region. Funding has been secured by different sources, which include a grant from the Scottish Government, the Swiss Pakistan Society, and many other private donor organisations and individuals. HF is planning the next phase of its program, which will focus on the empowerment of women through skill training and livelihood opportunities.
MERCY Malaysia has set up two clinics in the districts of Nowshera and Charsadda, each with a local doctor and three medical staff. It also sent a team on 12 August to support the clinics. The NGO donated five units of ultra-filtration water systems worth US$15,000 and donated US$40,000 worth of tents, food and drinking water.
ICNA Relief Canada is actively providing emergency relief across the country. ICNA Relief is running medical relief camps in 13 locations, distributing free medication and providing ambulance services. ICNA Relief is also providing food packages (Flour, Sugar, Cooking Oil, Rice, Lentils, Biscuits and other basics) and shelters to the flood victims. Tent distribution is being made to help those whose houses have been washed away by the floods. ICNA Relief Canada has appealed to its donors for $5 million raise.
Muslim Charity has launched £2 million appeal to help the victims of floods in Pakistan and raised £2 million as of October 2010. Muslim Charity targets to benefit 150,000 people through its activities. Muslim Charity is providing food to 100,000 people for the month of Ramadan, clean drinking water to 50,000 people, medical facilities to 30,000 people through its 18 medical camps and shelter to 8,000 people. In its second phase of relief work; Muslim Charity targets to rebuild 500 houses, 2 primary schools, 2 medical centres and 10 mosques in Pakistan.
Trócaire had raised around €700,000 in donations from the Irish public by 13 August 2010. The organisation later said there were difficulties accessing food.
 UNICEF has set up 24 medical camps in the affected areas, benefiting around one million people.
Giving Children Hope donated medical supplies and other aid to several medical centres in Peshawar.
Médecins Sans Frontières was in a position to respond immediately due to its long-term presence in the country. MSF has deployed 100 international and 1200 Pakistani staff to provide medical care, particularly disease prevention, and resettlement services.

Other organisations
UN-SPIDER Pakistan's Space and Upper Atmosphere Research Commission (SUPARCO) received assistance through the SpaceAid Framework of the United Nations Platform for Space-based Information for Disaster Management and Emergency Response (UN-SPIDER) during the first phase of the disaster. Through SpaceAid, SUPARCO was able to access post and pre-disaster satellite data. This information was used by Pakistan's National Disaster Management Authority (NDMA) and relief organisations to assist response efforts and assess damages. Humanitarian NGOs such as iMMAP and the Pakistan Youth Organization have been using this information for their operations as well.
International Centre for Integrated Mountain Development (ICIMOD) through the assistance of Sentinel Asi and International Charters provided assistance to the disaster networks in Pakistan Space and Upper Atmosphere Research Commission (SUPARCO), National Disaster Management Authority (NDMA), Pakistan Meteorological Department (PMD) and International Agency European Commission (EC). They were able to use our maps (pre and post crisis) and geospatial databases to assist in emergency response and assessing damage extent. On daily basis near-real time flood inundation online viewer was also developed to address flood-water direction and its movement which are used in humanitarian assistance.
The United Methodist Church's representatives are on the ground with a project that within the week will purify more than 3.5 million litres of drinking water and benefit more than 73,000 people a day. The Methodist are also helping to bring food relief and emergency shelter to tens of thousands of Pakistanis affected by the flooding.
The Pakistan Cricket Board and English Cricket Board Cricket Boards are working together to organise a fundraiser exhibition match for the benefit of flood victims.
The Australian Broadcasting Corporation (ABC) had raised at least A$2.8 million for UNICEF's flood relief efforts through its nationwide radio appeal from Friday 27 August until 3 pm on Sunday 29 August 2010.
Stockport town council, Cheshire started a Pakistan flood appeal on 5 September 2010.

Response by individuals
The Saudi King Abdullah bin Abdul Aziz has donated US$5.3 million from his private money.
The Saudi Crown Prince Sultan Abdullah bin Abdul Aziz donated US$2.7 million personally.
The Saudi Interior Minister Nayef bin Abdul Aziz Al Saud donated US$2 million personally.
The Governor of Tabuk Province in Saudi Arabia donated US$1 million from his private money.
The Chairman of Samba Financial Group of Saudi Arabia, Eesa bin Mohammad al Eesa donated US$2 million from his private money.
Her Highness Fatima bint Mubarak Al Ketbi, the wife of the founder and the first president of UAE, donated AED 5 million from her private money.
The wife of Turkish Prime Minister Emine Erdoğan personally donated TL 100,000 and also donated her jewellery including a precious necklace, which was very memorable and dear to her as it was given to her by her husband on their wedding. She gave it Mrs Fawziya Gilani, wife of the Prime Minister Yousaf Raza Gilani to be donated to a flood-stricken girl in her dowry, the Turkish people bought the necklace in an auction and gave it back to her. But she again donated it to the flood victims, when Prime Minister Yousaf Raza Gilani arrived in a camp near Dadu, it was found that eight girls from the floods victims were to get married, so the necklace was auctioned again and was bought by chairman of NADRA, Ali Arshad Hakim for Rs. 16,00000 and the amount was divided among eight girls. Ali Arshad Hakim gave this necklace to Prime Minister Yousaf Reza Gilani and once again it came back to the Prime Minister. The Prime Minister of Pakistan, Yousaf Raza Gilani conferred on Begum Emine Erdogan, Hilal-i-Pakistan the highest civilian medal of Pakistan for her efforts. This necklace is now displayed in a showcase in the Prime Minister House, Islamabad and it has become a unique symbol of Pak-Turk friendship.
Turkish businesswoman Semahat Arsel donated TL500,000 personally.
Turkish businessman Süleyman Varlıbaş donated TL350,000 from his private money.
Merve Tekinay, a nine-year old Turkish girl donated her savings of $83.72 and her only doll.
The Kuwait Finance House donated $2 million to Pakistan.
The E-Q8 Petrochemicals of Kuwait, has donated $100,000 to Pakistan.
 The Open Society Foundations, led by George Soros donated $5 million in addition to an initial $50,000.
The Bill and Melinda Gates Foundation donated $700,000 for flood relief.
 New Zealander, Suzanne Wingate (educator and humanitarian) donated medical supplies, an undisclosed sum of her private money, blankets, household goods, food, clothes and toys. More importantly she donated time managing a camp clinic in North Karachi, where she created a camp classroom and raised relief supplies from Karachi's Rotary Club.
 Angelina Jolie donated $100,000 (€75,000) to the United Nations for flood relief operations in Pakistan.
 Tim Beel donated $500,000 (€300,000) to the UN for Humanitarian Aid.
 Queen Elizabeth II made a personal donation to the relief effort for flood victims in Pakistan, giving an undisclosed amount via the British Red Cross.

Response by Islamic militant organisations
Jama'at-ud-Da'wah (JuD), an organisation which is a front for banned militant group Lashkar-e-Taiba, stated that it had 2000 workers providing flood relief. JuD was banned by the United Nations in 2008 after the 2008 Mumbai attacks but was openly distributing aid under the Falah-e-Insaniyat arm of the organisation.
 Al Rasheed trust, an organisation under UN sanctions for its links to Al-Qaeda, was among the first to provide aid to the flood victims.
 Haqqania madrasa, an Islamic school with ties to the Haqqani network, converted one of their buildings into a shelter and cared for 2500 victims.
 The Taliban offered to raise $20 million for flood relief if the Pakistani government rejected aid from "Christians and Jews".

Response by corporations
Telenor Pakistan donated $2.8 million from 2010 to 2012 along with rehabilitating 44 public schools at a cost of $1.5 million 
Karachi Electric Supply Corporation was involved in the flood relief operations, providing shelter, food, medical care, electricity and purified water to approximately 30,000 people in Thatta, Sajjawal, Sunda and Challian. KESC also provided support to four camps in Karachi; supplies delivered included tents, food, general household items, water purification plants free medical treatment to around 14,600 people. In Karachi, KESC supplied free electricity to several districts.
Coca-Cola announced a donation of US$1 million.
 Deloitte, a business advisory firm, donated £1 million to the DEC appeal.
 Google Foundation donated $250,000 for the flood relief efforts. A corporate broadcast was sent to all employees to raise awareness about the disaster.
 BMO Financial Group, Canada's oldest bank, donated C$100,000 in support of Red Cross relief and recovery efforts. In addition, the company accepted donations through its BMO Bank of Montreal branches in Canada and its Harris branches in the United States. The company also waived fees for fund transfers and drafts to Pakistan through 17 September 2010.
 Dell announced a $150,000 donation to the flood victims and matched any amount donated by Dell employees.
 Intel donated $100,000 to American Red Cross for flood relief. In addition, Intel will match employee donations up to $2k per employee. A corporate broadcast was sent to all employees to raise awareness about the disaster.
 JPMorgan donated $100,000.
 Bank of America Corporation donated $75,000 to Save the Children.
 BP donated $1 million to the International Federation of Red Cross and Red Crescent Societies.
 Northwestern Mutual Foundation donated $100,000 to the American Red Cross.
 Microsoft donated $700,000 cash donation, deployment of disaster management software for the Govt of Punjab at no cost, urgent food supplies to the flood victims in KPK province and software donations to various NGOs currently involved in relief activities.
Turkish businessman Yiğit Bulut donated Tl300,000 on behalf of Ciner Group.
GSK donated medicines to IMC to treat 40,000 flood-affected victims

Criticism of response
The Pakistani government was blamed for sluggish and disorganised response to the floods. The perceived disorganised and insufficient response led to riots, with looting of aid convoys by hunger-stricken people. The lack of a unified government response allowed Islamist groups such as Lashkar-e-Taiba and Jamaat-e-Islami to supply aid with minimal resistance. Zardari was also criticised for going ahead with visits to meet leaders in Britain and France at a time when his nation was facing catastrophe. In Sindh, the ruling Pakistan People's Party ministers were accused of using their influence to redirect floodwaters from their crops while risking densely populated areas leading Pakistani UN ambassador Abdullah Hussain Haroon to call for an inquiry.

The United Nations criticised the international community for responding slowly, despite the ferocity and magnitude of the disaster. On 9 August, only $45 million in aid had been committed, which is far less than usual for this scale of disaster. In an analysis of the response to the disaster, The Guardian said that there was a dire need of relief. It quoted the UN's humanitarian affairs coordination office, saying that "[s]ix million [of the 14 million affected] are children and 3 million women of child-bearing age. This is a higher figure than in the 2004 Indian Ocean tsunami."

An analysis by AP's correspondent, Nahal Toosi, suggested that the low death toll, the protracted timeline, the lack of celebrity involvement, the impression of government incompetence and donor fatigue were contributing factors.

British Prime Minister David Cameron was accused by Pakistan of hampering international aid efforts after he claimed that Pakistan was responsible for promoting terrorism.

Neglect of minorities
It was reported that members of Pakistan's Ahmadiyya community, who were caught up in floods in Muzaffargarh, were not rescued from their homes because rescuers felt that Muslims must be given priority.

Members of the Sikh community, who arrived at gurdwaras in Lahore, also complained of government apathy. They said members of their community were abandoned in Khyber-Pakhtoonkhwa and had to arrange for rescues by themselves.

Protests broke out in Lyari relief camp after Hindu victims of the Baagri and Waghari nomadic tribes were served beef by the authorities in violation of their religious beliefs, which forbade beef consumption. The situation was resolved after officials from The Minority Affairs Ministry intervened.

Inequality
Haroon alleged that wealthy feudal warlords and landowners in Pakistan had diverted funds and resources away from the poor and into their own private relief efforts. There were also allegations that local authorities colluded with the warlords to divert funds. The floods accentuated Pakistan's sharp class divisions. The wealthy, with better access to transportation and other facilities, suffered far less than the poor.

See also

 2022 Pakistan floods
 1992 India–Pakistan floods
 2005 Kashmir earthquake
 2010 China floods
 2010 Ladakh floods
 2010 Northern Hemisphere heat waves
 2011 Sindh floods
 List of deadliest floods
 List of extreme weather records in Pakistan
 List of floods in Pakistan
 Nursing in Pakistan

References

External links

 Inter-agency Real Time Evaluation (IA RTE) of the Humanitarian Response to the Floods in Pakistan
 Factsheet 1995–2008 describing non-military aid given to Pakistan by OECD
 Pakistan Floods Relief Support
 The Pacific Disaster Center (PDC) has established a geospatial map service relating to the Pakistan flood event
 Pakistan GIS: Pakistan Flood 2010
 Updated list of relief organizations and donation resources
 Latest Updates on Floods in Pakistan
 Latest Updates on Pakistan Flood
 "Flood of Misery": Coverage at http://english.aljazeera.net
 Video:Pakistan in mass flood rescue
 In Pictures: Floods in Pakistan
 "The real war on 'terror' must begin"
 Coverage by Radio France Internationale in English
 Flooding in Pakistan – Earth Observatory (NASA, 10 August 2010)
 Flooding in Pakistan – Earth Observatory (NASA, 17 August 2010)
 Pakistan Flood Relief Flood Relief information
 UN Humanitarian Chief John Holmes: The Magnitude of the Pakistan Floods Is Unprecedented – video report by Democracy Now!
 Mapping Pakistan floods Overview of up-to-date map sources: probable flood-affected villages, towns and infrastructure.
 Pakistan Floods 2010 Donate for Flood Victims of Pakistan
 Managing a Disaster in Pakistan
 PreventionWeb 2010 Pakistan Floods 
 FAO – 2010 floods in Pakistan
 

Pakistan
Floods in Pakistan
Pakistan Floods, 2010
Pakistan Floods, 2010
History of Khyber Pakhtunkhwa
History of Sindh (1947–present)
History of Punjab, Pakistan (1947–present)
History of Balochistan, Pakistan (1947–present)
Government of Yousaf Raza Gillani
Climate change in Pakistan